Chauri Chaura railway station is a small railway station in Gorakhpur district, Uttar Pradesh. Its code is CC. It serves Chauri Chaura city. The station consists of two platforms. The platform is not well sheltered. It lacks many facilities including water and sanitation.

Trains 
 Arunachal AC Superfast Express
 Avadh Assam Express
 Amrapali Express
 Jan Sewa Express
 Amarnath Express
 Purvanchal Express (via Muzaffarpur)
 Kashi Express
 Lohit Express
 Saharsa–Amritsar Garib Rath Express
 Barauni–New Delhi AC Suvidha Special
 Delhi–Darbhanga AC Suvidha Special
 Raptisagar Express 
 Maur Dhawaj Express
 Vaishali Express
 New Jalpaiguri–Amritsar Karmabhoomi Express
 Bihar Sampark Kranti Superfast Express
 New Jalpaiguri–New Delhi Superfast Express
 Bapudham Express

References

Railway stations in Gorakhpur district
Varanasi railway division